Alsea is an unincorporated community in Benton County, in the U.S. state of Oregon. It is on Oregon Route 34 and the Alsea River. For statistical purposes, the United States Census Bureau has defined Alsea as a census-designated place (CDP). The census definition of the area may not precisely correspond to local understanding of the area with the same name. As of the 2020 Census, the population was 165.

Demographics

History
Alsea was named for the Alsea River, whose name was a corruption of "Alsi" (also spelled "Ulseah" and "Alsiias") the name of a Native American tribe, now known as the Alsea, that lived at the mouth of the river. The Alsea area was settled by Europeans early as 1855, when the name "Alseya Settlement" appeared on the Surveyor general's map. Alsea post office was established in 1871.

In the early 1850s settlers moved from the Willamette Valley into the Alsea area to take up donation land claims. While logging was once the primary industry in Alsea, it is now known as a place for fishing on the Alsea River, particularly for steelhead, and a favorite stopping point on a well-traveled cycling loop.

Climate
This region experiences warm (but not hot) and dry summers, with no average monthly temperatures above . According to the Köppen Climate Classification system, Alsea has a warm-summer Mediterranean climate, abbreviated "Csb" on climate maps.

School

Alsea High School, home of the Alsea Wolverines, is a charter school that serves k-12 and has a population of 460 students.

Covered bridge

Near Alsea is Hayden Bridge, a historic covered bridge listed on the National Register of Historic Places in 1979.

Notable people

 Thomas Benton Slate (December 2, 1880 – November 26, 1980) was raised in Alsea. He invented the first commercially viable method of producing dry ice, and later financed construction of an all-aluminum hulled airship, The City of Glendale, completed in 1929 but never flown.

References

External links
Alsea School District
Historic photos of Alsea from Salem Public Library
Historic photos of Hayden Covered Bridge

Census-designated places in Benton County, Oregon
Unincorporated communities in Benton County, Oregon
Alsea River
1871 establishments in Oregon
Populated places established in 1871
Census-designated places in Oregon
Unincorporated communities in Oregon